Dušan Letica (23 October 1884 – 19 September 1945) was a Serbian lawyer, translator, and Axis Power collaborationist during World War II.

References 

 
 
 
 
 

1884 births
1945 deaths
Serbia under German occupation
People from the Kingdom of Serbia
People from Valjevo
Finance ministers of Yugoslavia
Serbian people convicted of war crimes
Executed politicians
Government ministers of Serbia
Serbs of Bosnia and Herzegovina
Complutense University of Madrid alumni
University of Belgrade alumni
Serbian military personnel of World War I
Members of the Serbian Orthodox Church
People extradited to Yugoslavia
People extradited from the Soviet Union
People extradited from Germany
Inmates of Vladimir Central Prison
Serbian anti-communists
Executed Serbian collaborators with Nazi Germany